Dr. Declan J Meagher (1921-2019) was an Irish obstetrician, Master of the National Maternity Hospital, Dublin, and a champion of women's reproductive health.

Career
In 1963, Meagher set up one of the country's first family planning clinics. This was a time when most women in Ireland lived in poverty, had a large number of children, and suffered from high childbirth mortality rates. The Irish Catholic Church, which was heavily involved in healthcare through the ownership of hospitals and schools, imposed conservative views on family planning and contraception. It had most recently prevented the Mother and Child Scheme to come into force.

Meagher, who by 1970, had become Master of the National Maternity Hospital in Dublin, one of the largest maternity hospitals in Europe, sought to reduce perinatal mortality by implementing a new approach to the management of childbirth. He did so by giving a greater role to midwives, providing additional support for mothers and reducing prolonged labour. "The Dublin Experience" helped usher in the modern era of Irish obstetrics and led to the development of a clinical package of care now internationally known as "active management of labour".

Charity
After his career at the National Maternity Hospital,  Meagher took over as Director-General of the Holy Family Hospital in Bethlehem, in the West Bank. There, with the Order of Malta and the European Union, he helped build Palestine's first maternity ward, introduced maternity training programs for local doctors and midwives, and set up rural maternity care clinics for Palestinian women. Meagher also represented Ireland on the council of the Royal College of Obstetricians and Gynaecologists in London, which he used to share maternity care practices and build ties between the Republic of Ireland and Northern Ireland.

Publication
Meagher co-authored with  Kieran O'Driscoll, The Active Management of Labour, which is used in medical school curricula in Europe, Australia, Canada, Great Britain, and the United States.

References 

1921 births
2019 deaths
People from County Offaly
Irish obstetricians